Omar Heber Pouso Osores (born 28 February 1980) is a Uruguayan retired footballer who last played as a midfielder for Club de Gimnasia y Esgrima La Plata.

Club career

Pouso moved to Europe in August 2006 when he joined Charlton Athletic of the Premier League on a season-long loan from Peñarol. He played his only league match the following month in a 1-0 home defeat to Portsmouth, in which he was substituted after 57 minutes. Pouso was signed by Iain Dowie, and was released alongside compatriot Gonzalo Sorondo by new manager Alan Pardew in February 2007.

International career
Pouso has 15 caps for Uruguay and scored one goal, a volley in a friendly international against England at Anfield in March 2006.

References

External links

1980 births
Living people
Uruguayan footballers
Uruguayan expatriate footballers
Uruguay under-20 international footballers
Uruguay international footballers
Uruguayan expatriate sportspeople in Argentina
Uruguayan expatriate sportspeople in England
Uruguayan expatriate sportspeople in Paraguay
Expatriate footballers in Argentina
Expatriate footballers in England
Expatriate footballers in Paraguay
Expatriate football managers in Chile
Danubio F.C. players
Peñarol players
Charlton Athletic F.C. players
Club de Gimnasia y Esgrima La Plata footballers
Club Libertad footballers
Uruguayan Primera División players
Premier League players
Argentine Primera División players
2004 Copa América players
Association football midfielders